Rixon is a surname which may refer to:

 Bill Rixon (1941–2003), Australian politician
 Cheryl Rixon (born 1954), Australian actress
 Steve Rixon (born 1954), Australian former cricketer
 Rixon Corozo (born 1981), Ecuadorian footballer

Rixson and Rickson are variations of Rixon:
 Denis Rixson
 Rickson Gracie
 Joe Rickson

See also 

 Fort Rixon, a village in the Republic of Zimbabwe
Rixon, Dorset, a village in Dorset, England

Surnames
Surnames of Old English origin
Surnames of English origin
Surnames of British Isles origin
English-language surnames